Claude Chirac,  (born 6 December 1962) is the youngest daughter of French president Jacques Chirac and was her father's personal advisor from 1994 until his death in 2019.

Biography 
Chirac is the director of communication at PRTP.PA which is part of Kering SA, a luxury group based in Paris, France. The group owns many luxury brands such as Italian labels Gucci and Bottega Veneta, French label Yves Saint Laurent as well as English label Alexander McQueen.

She had a relationship with Thierry Rey, the 1980 Summer Olympics and World gold medal champion in Judo. Rey is the father of her son, Martin Rey-Chirac.

Since 11 February 2011, Chirac has been married to former general secretary of the Elysée, Frédéric Salat-Baroux.

Honours 

 3rd Class of the Order of the Cross of Terra Mariana, Estonia
 Knight of the Legion of Honour, France (14 April 2017)
  Officer of the Order of Merit of the Italian Republic, Italy (21 October 1999) 
 Commander of the Order of Merit, Portugal (8 July 1999)

External links 
 Claude! Papa! - Article about Claude and her role as personal advisor from the election 2002
 Letter from Paris – John Laurenson on Claude Chirac's crucial but understated electoral role

References 

1962 births
Living people
Politicians from Paris
Jacques Chirac
Paris 2 Panthéon-Assas University alumni

Officers of the Order of Merit of the Italian Republic
Recipients of the Order of the Cross of Terra Mariana, 3rd Class
Children of national leaders of France